Kenyatta Johnson is a Democratic member of the Philadelphia City Council. He formerly served in the Pennsylvania House of Representatives from the 186th District. He represents the 2nd District, which covers parts of Center City, South and Southwest Philadelphia, as well as the stadium area, Philadelphia International Airport, the Navy Yard and the Eastwick, Grays Ferry, Hawthorne and Point Breeze neighborhoods. Councilman Johnson was re-elected in the May 2015 primary election to represent the 2nd District for a second term.

Politics
Johnson founded Peace Not Guns after the murder of his cousin. He has worked since 1998 to end gun violence through education and programs created to give children an alternative to the streets. His activism led to a successful run for the Pennsylvania House of Representatives. He served as State Representative for the 186th Legislative District from 2009 until 2012 when he took the oath of office for City Council. He was a senate staffer for six years before running for the House of Representatives.

Johnson is a former volunteer for AmeriCorps which is the national service organization that allows citizens to serve their communities. He was also a founding staff member of City Year, the non-profit AmeriCorps organization whose primary goal is to build advocacy through service.

Johnson's 2015 re-election campaign was "the most drawn-out and negative race" primary election of that election year. He defeated real estate developer Ori Feibush.

Federal indictment
In an interview on January 28, 2020, with The Philadelphia Inquirer, Johnson announced that he and his wife, political consultant Dawn Chavous, expected federal prosecutors to announce the charges against them. Johnson and his lawyer said they believe the grand jury indictment would focus on the relationships among the councilman’s City Hall office, Chavous's consulting firm, and Universal Companies, a South Philadelphia community development nonprofit and charter-school operator founded by the music producer Kenny Gamble.

On January 29, 2020, federal prosecutors brought a 22-count indictment against Johnson and charged him and associates with racketeering, wire fraud, tax fraud, and other crimes.  The indictment accuses Johnson of allegedly abusing his “councilmanic prerogative” to influence zoning decisions in his district for his own profit. The case was declared a mistrial in April 2022 after the jury deadlocked; the government retried the case and Johnson was acquitted.

See also
List of members of Philadelphia City Council since 1952

References

External links
Official website of Kenyatta Johnson

Living people
Democratic Party members of the Pennsylvania House of Representatives
Philadelphia City Council members
Mansfield University of Pennsylvania alumni
African-American state legislators in Pennsylvania
Year of birth missing (living people)
African-American city council members in Pennsylvania
21st-century African-American people